Tricarpelema brevipedicellatum is a monocotyledonous herbaceous plant in the family Commelinaceae. The species is known from only two collections made in Vietnam and very little is known about it.

References 

brevipedicellatum
Endemic flora of Vietnam
Plants described in 2007
Endangered plants